The Philadelphi Route, also called Philadelphi Corridor, refers to a narrow strip of land, 14 km (8.699 miles) in length, situated along the border between Gaza Strip and Egypt. Under the provisions of the Egypt–Israel peace treaty of 1979, it was established as a buffer zone controlled and patrolled by Israeli forces. One purpose of the Philadelphi Route was to prevent the movement of illegal materials (including weapons and ammunition) and people between Egypt and the Gaza Strip. Palestinians, in cooperation with some Egyptians, have built smuggling tunnels under the Philadelphi Route to move these into the Gaza Strip.

After the 1995 Oslo Accords, Israel was allowed to retain the security corridor. Following Israel's unilateral disengagement from the Gaza-strip in 2005, the Philadelphi Accord with Egypt was concluded, which authorized Egypt to deploy 750 border guards along the route to patrol the border on Egypt's side. The Palestinian side of the border was controlled by Palestinian Authority, until the 2007 takeover by Hamas. The joint authority for the Rafah Border Crossing was transferred to the Palestinian Authority and Egypt for restricted passage by Palestinian ID card holders, and by others by exception.

Background
The 1979 Egypt–Israel peace treaty, in which Israeli agreed to withdraw from the Sinai in exchange for peace with Egypt, stipulated that the border with Egypt would follow the border of Mandatory Palestine. The new border cut across Rafah, dividing the town and leaving families separated on both sides of the border. Rafah would be the main border crossing in Gaza. It was agreed that the area near the border (known as Area C) would be demilitarized, with Egypt only permitted to maintain police forces there.

The Philadelphi Route is 14 km long and runs entirely through the demilitarized zone, from the Mediterranean Sea to the Kerem Shalom border crossing in the south, which is a three way border crossing between Israel, Egypt and the Gaza Strip.

Philadelphi Accord

In 2004, the Knesset passed a resolution to unilaterally withdraw all Israeli citizens and forces from the Gaza Strip, which went into force in August 2005. To enable Israel's evacuation from the Philadelphi Corridor, while preventing smuggling of weapons from Egypt into the Gaza and infiltration and other criminal activity, Israel signed with Egypt the "Agreed Arrangements Regarding the Deployment of a Designated Force of Border Guards Along the Border in the Rafah Area" (Philadelphi Accord) on 1 September 2005. Under the Philadelphi Accord, Egypt was authorized to deploy border guards along the Philadelphi route to patrol the border on Egypt's side. Part of the agreement was a continuous coordination between Israel and Egypt regarding operations and intelligence.

Much opposition arose within the "Israeli defense establishment" to vacating the Philadelphi route for strategic reasons.  The primary concern was the militarization of Gaza and the threat to Israeli security that its militarization would pose. However, it was decided to vacate the corridor in order to prevent Israeli-Palestinian friction which could destabilize the region further.

Israel's decision to withdraw from the Phildelphi Route also posed a threat to the neighboring Egyptians through the potential militarization of Gaza.  It was feared that Israel's departure would create a power vacuum that the weak Palestinian leadership would not be able to fill, thus creating a void to be filled by radical Islamists.

The Accord itself contains 83 clauses and specifically describes the mission and obligations of the parties, including the specific types of machinery, weaponry and infrastructure permitted.

Egyptian Border Guard Force
Under the Philadelphi Accord, Egypt was authorized to deploy 750 border guards along the route to patrol the border on Egypt's side. The agreement specified that the Egyptian force is "a designated force for the combating of terrorism and infiltration across the border" and not intended for any military purposes.

The Accord specifically indicated that the new agreement did not modify or amend the 1979 Egypt–Israel peace treaty, and maintained the status of the Philaldelphi route and Sinai desert as a demilitarized zone.
The parties acknowledge that the BGF [border Guard Force] deployment and these Agreed Arrangements, in no way constitute an amendment to or a revision or modification of Annex I to the Peace Treaty. Rather they constitute additional mission-oriented security measures agreed upon by the parties. – Philadelphi Accord, Article 9
Instead, it "enhance[ed] Egypt's capability to fight smuggling along the border," while ensuring that the forces would not serve any military purposes. Israel insisted on the inclusion of the agreement provisions indicating that it was not an amendment to the 1979 Peace Treaty because during negotiations Egypt attempted to frame the agreement toward the re-militarization of the Sinai and its borders with Israel and Gaza.

The Philadelphi Accord created the Egyptian Border Guard Force (BGF) composed of 750 ground personnel divided between headquarters and four companies. The agreement specified that the BGF be equipped with the following:
 500 assault rifles
 67 light machine guns
 27 light anti-personnel launchers
 ground radar
 31 police-style vehicles
 44 logistical and auxiliary vehicles

Sentry posts, watchtowers and logistical facilities were permitted. Heavy armored vehicles, fortification, military-style intelligence-gathering equipment, and weaponry and equipment beyond the above numbers were prohibited.

Controversy in the Knesset
A number of scholars have looked into the legal issue of whether or not the Philadelphi Accord needed to be passed by the Knesset. Generally, the Knesset approves of major treaties either before or after their passage. The issue arose because the Philadelphi Accord would partially militarize Area C of the Egypt–Israel Peace Treaty, changing the treaty and hence needing Knesset approval. This position was advocated by the Knesset's Foreign Affairs and Defense Committee Chairperson, Yuval Steinitz; he was supported by MK Danny Yatom and they jointly filed a petition to the Supreme Court against the Government. Prime Minister Ariel Sharon on the other hand, argued that the treaty did not change the "demilitarized" status of Area C, and therefore was not a significant enough treaty that it needed to be ratified. On July 6, 2005, the Attorney General ruled that the government was not bound to seek Knesset approval for the treaty, but convention stipulated that it should.

Rafah border crossing 

Following the disengagement from Gaza, Israel signed with the Palestinian Authority the Agreement on Movement and Access (AMA) on 15 November 2005. The Agreement allowed the opening of the Gaza-Egypt border for restricted passage of Palestinian residents, and the export of agricultural products from Gaza. The AMA also promised a link between Gaza and West Bank for busses and trucks, construction of a Gaza Seaport, talks about a Gaza airport, and more freedom movement within the West Bank. None of the promises were redeemed.

The Rafah border was opened on 25 November 2005, operated by the Palestinian Authority and US-sponsored  Egypt, under supervision of EU observers. During the first six months of 2006, the crossing was opened nine and a half hours a day with an average of 650 people crossing daily each way, which was almost double the average prior to the AMA. After the capture of an Israeli soldier, the Rafah border was closed on 25 June 2006, although the incident did not happen in Rafah. Since then, the crossing was only irregularly opened for very limited cases. Israel denied the EU observers access to the border crossing. The border was never opened for the passage of goods. When Hamas took over the Gaza Strip in 2007, Egypt and Israel closed the borders with Gaza.

After 2007 
In January 2008, Palestinian militants breached several parts of the wall bordering the town of Rafah. Thousands of Gazans flowed into Egypt in search of food and supplies.  the Egyptian Army continued to destroy tunnels linking Egypt and Gaza and their security source said its demolition will continue "in order to fight any element of terrorism."

After the fall of the Mubarak regime in 2011, Egypt relaxed restrictions at its border with the Gaza Strip, allowing more Palestinians to cross freely for the first time in four years. The Egyptian army continued to destroy Gaza Strip smuggling tunnels, according to the Egyptian army "in order to fight any element of terrorism".

As of April 2013, Egypt reinforced its troops on the border with the Gaza Strip. Egyptian Army has been destroying  tunnels by flooding them.

See also
 Egypt – Gaza subterranean barrier
 Rafah Border Crossing

References

External links
 SULLIVAN, Denis Joseph; JONES, Kimberly A. Global Security Watch - Egypt: A Reference Handbook, ABC-CLIO/Greenwood, 2008, pp. 116s.

Egypt–Gaza border
Gaza–Israel conflict
Israeli Security Forces
1979 establishments in the Israeli Military Governorate